Comics Factory (Fabrika komiksov) is a comics imprint of major Russian book publisher AST. It serves as a translator and the licensor of European graphic novels, Japanese manga, Korean manhwa, Taiwan and Hong Kong manhua, Original English-language manga. It also released Russian-language manga of Russian and Ukrainian authors, i.e. Almanac of Russian Manga (MNG). Comics Factory is a part of Publishers Association of Russia (ASKI). It was founded in 2006 by publisher Feodor Yeremeev, translator Igor Bogdanov and film director Pavel Braila. Its headquarters are located in Yekaterinburg, Moscow and Vladivostok.

Comics Factory is known for publishing horror comics and highly controversial titles, such as Suehiro Maruo's ero guro manga Shōjo Tsubaki (aka Mr. Arashi's Amazing Freak Show) and Lunatic Lover’s.

Licenses

Manga

Manhwa

Manhua 
 Divine Melody

References

External links
  .

Manga distributors
Manhwa distributors
Publishing companies established in 2006
Comic book publishing companies of Russia
Companies based in Yekaterinburg
Manhua distributors